The Luxembourg Chess Championship has been held since 1932 by the  (FLDE), which was established in 1931 and joined FIDE in 1946.

Winners

{| class="sortable wikitable"
! Year !! Luxembourg Champion
|-
| 1932 ||Francis Kraus
|-
| 1933 || Louis Philippe
|-
| 1934 || Louis Philippe
|-
| 1935 ||Charles Doerner
|-
| 1936 ||Francis Kraus
|-
| 1937 ||Francis Kraus
|-
| 1938 ||Charles Doerner
|-
| 1939 ||Charles Doerner
|-
| 1940 ||Charles Doerner
|-
| 1946 ||Charles Doerner
|-
| 1947 ||Charles Doerner
|-
| 1948 ||Charles Doerner
|-
| 1949 ||Charles Doerner
|-
| 1950 ||Charles Doerner
|-
| 1951 ||Charles Doerner
|-
| 1952 ||Charles Doerner
|-
| 1953 ||Eugène Bestgen
|-
| 1954 ||Aloyse Neu
|-
| 1955 ||Fernand Wantz
|-
| 1956 ||Fernand Wantz
|-
| 1958 || Georges Philippe
|-
| 1959 ||Aloyse Neu
|-
| 1960 ||Alphonse Conrady
|-
| 1961 || Georges Philippe
|-
| 1962 ||Eugène Bestgen
|-
| 1963 ||Eugène Bestgen
|-
| 1964 ||Alphonse Conrady
|-
| 1965 || Georges Philippe
|-
| 1966 || Georges Philippe
|-
| 1967 ||Josy Feller
|-
| 1968 ||Josy Feller
|-
| 1969 ||Raymond Schneider
|-
| 1971 ||Josy Feller
|-
| 1973 ||Josy Feller
|-
| 1975 || 
|-
| 1976 ||Norbert Stull
|-
| 1977 ||Georges Haas
|-
| 1978 ||Georges Haas
|-
| 1979 ||Norbert Stull
|-
| 1980 ||Georges Haas
|-
| 1981 ||Jean Schammo
|-
| 1982 ||Josy Feller
|-
| 1983 ||Norbert Stull
|-
| 1985 ||Hubert Mossong
|-
| 1986 ||Roger Hofmann
|-
| 1987 ||Georges Haas
|-
| 1988 ||Shlomo Marcovici
|-
| 1989 ||Norbert Stull
|-
| 1990 || 
|-
| 1991 ||Norbert Stull
|-
| 1992 ||Hubert Mossong
|- 
| 1993 ||Alain Schartz
|-
| 1994 ||Lucien Gaspar
|- 
| 1995 ||Carlo Menghi
|-
| 1996 ||Camille Wians
|-
| 1997 ||Marc Mertens
|- 
| 1998 || Elvira Berend
|-
| 1999 ||Guy Monaville
|-
| 2000 ||Claude Wagener
|-
| 2001 ||Josy Feller
|-
| 2002 ||Alain Schartz
|-
| 2003 || 
|-
| 2004 ||Jean-Marie Weber
|-
| 2005 ||Vlad Serban
|-
| 2006 || Tom Weber
|-
| 2007 ||Jean-Marie Weber
|-
| 2008 ||Alain Schartz
|-
| 2009 ||Mietek Bakalarz
|-
| 2010 ||Vlad Serban
|-
| 2011 ||Mietek Bakalarz
|-
| 2012 || Michael Wiedenkeller
|-
| 2013 ||Michael Wiedenkeller
|-
| 2014 ||Fred Berend
|-
| 2015 ||Elvira Berend
|- 
| 2016 ||Elvira Berend
|- 
| 2017 ||Fred Berend
|- 
| 2018 ||Jean-Marie Weber
|}

References

Chess in Luxembourg
Chess national championships
Recurring sporting events established in 1932
1932 establishments in Luxembourg
1932 in chess
Sports competitions in Luxembourg